CFM International is a 50/50 Franco-American joint venture between GE Aviation and Safran Aircraft Engines (formerly known as Snecma). It was formed to build and support the CFM56 series of turbofan engines. The company is the world’s leading supplier of commercial aircraft engines, delivering to date more than 37,500 of its engines to more than 570 operators. As of 2019, it holds 39% of the world's commercial aircraft engine market share.

The names of CFM International and the CFM56 product line are derived from the two parent companies' commercial engine designations: GE's CF6 and Snecma's M56 (its 56th project).

In 2016 CFM delivered 1,665 CFM56 and 77 LEAP, and booked 2,677 orders : 876 CFM56 and 1,801 LEAP for US$36 billion at list price. The LEAP engine backlog exceeds 12,200 which is valued at more than US$170 billion at list price.

In 2017, CFM delivered 1,900 engines including 459 LEAPs, of which it plans to deliver 1,200 in 2018, 1,800 in 2019 and more than 2,000 in 2020.
In 2019, CFM deliveries stood at 2,127 : 1,736 Leaps and 391 CFM56s (-63%), and plans to produce 1,400 engines in 2020.
Due to the impact of the COVID-19 pandemic on aviation, deliveries of Leap engines across the first nine months of 2020 fell to 622 from 1,316 in the same period in 2019, and 123 CFM56s against 327, while Leap fleet cycles were down 15% year-on-year and CFM cycles were 48% lower.

CFM announced the RISE project in June 2021, with plans to enter service in the mid 2030s.

Products
 CFM International CFM56 (F108)
 CFM International LEAP
 CFM International RISE (in development)

References

External links
 Official site

Multinational aircraft engine manufacturers
France–United States relations
General Electric subsidiaries
Joint ventures